Act of Violence is a 1956 television play broadcast by the British Broadcasting Corporation. It was later remade as an Australian television play in 1959.

Cast
Andrée Melly - Lenora
Keith Michell - The Man
Ewen Solon - Inspektor Frink
Leonard Sachs - Professor Kroz
Diana Lambert - Katina Kroz
Philip Stainton - Vent
Peter Swanwick - General Zuglin

References

External links

British television plays
English-language television shows
British live television shows
1956 television plays